List of cemeteries in Uruguay.

Montevideo Department
 British Cemetery
 Buceo Cemetery
 Central Cemetery
 Cerro Cemetery
 Norte Cemetery
 Paso Molino Cemetery

Artigas Department
 Bella Unión Cemetery
 Central Cemetery

Canelones Department

 Atlántida Cemetery
 Jewish Cemetery
 Las Piedras Municipal Cemetery
 Los Fresnos de Carrasco
 Migues Cemetery
 Pando Cemetery
 Parque del Recuerdo
 Parque del Reencuentro
 Parque Martinelli de Carrasco
 San Antonio Cemetery
 San Jacinto Cemetery
 San Ramón Cemetery
 Santa Lucía Cemetery
 Santa Rosa Cemetery
 Sauce Cemetery
 Soca Cemetery
 Tala Cemetery

Cerro Largo Department
 Aceguá Cemetery
 Fraile Muerto Cemetery
 Melo Cemetery

Colonia Department
 Carmelo Cemetery
 Colonia del Sacramento Cemetery
 Colonia Suiza Cemetery
 Evangelical Cemetery
 Tarariras Cemetery

Durazno Department
 Carlos Reyles Cemetery
 Durazno Cemetery
 La Paloma Cemetery
 Sarandí del Yi Cemetery
 Villa del Carmen Cemetery

Flores Department
 Trinidad Cemetery

Florida Department
 Capilla del Sauce Cemetery
 Casupá Cemetery
 Chamizo Cemetery
 Florida Cemetery

Lavalleja Department
 Cementerio del Este, Minas
 Mariscala Cemetery
 Pirarajá Cemetery
 Solís de Mataojo Cemetery

Maldonado Department
 Municipal Cemetery
 Pan de Azúcar Cemetery
 San Carlos Cemetery

Paysandú Department
 Guichón Cemetery
 Paysandú Cemetery
 Perpetuidad Cemetery
 Quebracho Cemetery

Río Negro Department
 Fray Bentos Cemetery
 Nuevo Berlín Cemetery
 San Javier Cemetery
 Young Local Cemetery

Rivera Department
 Central Cemetery
 Lagunón Cemetery
 Parque Homero Pereira

Rocha Department
 Castillos Cemetery
 Chuy Cemetery
 Lascano Cemetery
 Rocha Cemetery

Salto Department
 Belén Cemetery
 Central Cemetery
 Los Azahares

San José Department
 Municipal Cemetery
 Mater Terra

Soriano Department
 Cardona Cemetery
 Juan Lacaze Cemetery
 Municipal Cemetery

Tacuarembó Department
 Curtina Cemetery
 Municipal Cemetery
 San Gregorio de Polanco Cemetery
 Tambores Cemetery

Treinta y Tres Department
 Parque Cemetery
 Santa Clara de Olimar Cemetery
 Treinta y Tres Cemetery

Uruguay
 
Cemeteries